Damien Byrne (born 16 June 1978) is an Irish retired Gaelic footballer who played as a right corner-back for the Tipperary senior team.

Born in Fethard, County Tipperary, Byrne first arrived on the inter-county scene at the age of sixteen when he first linked up with the Tipperary minor team before later joining the under-21 and junior sides. He joined the senior panel during the 1998 championship. Byrne later became a regular member of the starting fifteen and won one Tommy Murphy Cup medal.

At club level Byrne is a two-time championship medallist with Fethard.

He retired from inter-county football following the conclusion of the 2005 championship.

Honours

Player

Fethard
Tipperary Senior Football Championship (2): 1997, 2001

Tipperary
Tommy Murphy Cup (1): 2005
McGrath Cup (1): 2003
All-Ireland Junior Football Championship (1): 1998
Munster Junior Football Championship (1): 1998

References

1976 births
Living people
Fethard Gaelic footballers
Fethard hurlers
Tipperary inter-county Gaelic footballers